Stefanie "Steffi" Koch (born 13 October 1981) is a German ski mountaineer.

Koch was born in Anger and grew on the farm of their parents with her three siblings. In her teens she started mountain biking and participated in triathlon competitions. She passed the clerical administrative assistant training and was inspired of ski mountaineering by her boyfriend Stefan Klinger. Her aunt Resi was the first female German, who climbed on the Nanga Parbat in 2001.

Selected results 
 2004:
 2nd, Mountain Attack team
 2005:
 5th, German Championship single
 2nd, Mountain Attack race
 2006:
 3rd, German Championship single
 2nd, "International Open", Saalbach
 4th, World Championship relay race (together with Judith Graßl, Barbara Gruber and Silvia Treimer)
 4.th, |World Championship team race (together with Judith Graßl)
 2007:
 1st, German Championship single
 2nd, Mountain Attack Trace
 2nd, Sellaronda Skimarathon (together with Judith Graßl)
 3rd, Trofeo Mezzalama (together with Judith Graßl and Silvia Treimer)
 4th, European Championship relay race (together with Judith Graßl and Silvia Treimer)
 4th, European Championship team race (together with Judith Graßl)
 10th, European Championship combination ranking
 2008:
 1st, German Championship team
 2nd, German Championship single
 2nd, German Championship vertical race
 2nd, Rofan Xtreme
 6th, World Championship team race (together with Judith Graßl)
 7th, Pierra Menta (together with Judith Graßl)
 9th, World Championship single race

Patrouille des Glaciers 

 2006: 3rd, together with Judith Graßl and Silvia Treimer
 2008: 4th, together with Judith Graßl and Silvia Treimer

External links 
 Stefanie Koch at skimountaineering.com

References 

1981 births
Living people
German female ski mountaineers
People from Berchtesgadener Land
Sportspeople from Upper Bavaria